The 2006–07 Croatian Football Cup was the sixteenth season of Croatia's football knockout competition.

Calendar

Preliminary round
The preliminary round was held on 30 August 2006.

First round
Matches played on 20 September 2006.

Second round
Matches played on 24 and 25 October 2006.

Quarter-finals
First legs were held on 21 and 22 November and second legs between 28 November and 6 December 2006.

|}

Semi-finals

First legs

Second legs

Slaven Belupo won 3–2 on aggregate.

Dinamo Zagreb won 3–2 on aggregate.

Final

First leg

Second leg

See also
2006–07 Croatian First Football League
2006–07 Croatian Second Football League

External links
Official website 

Croatian Football Cup seasons
Croatian Cup, 2006-07
Croatian Cup, 2006-07